S.G. Goodman is an American singer-songwriter.

Early life 
Goodman is from Hickman, Kentucky. The Southern Baptist church played a central role in her childhood in Kentucky. Goodman began performing by singing in church. Her father was a farmer. She has played rhythm guitar since she was 15. 

Goodman moved to Murray, Kentucky to attend Murray State University.

Career 
Prior to her solo career, Goodman was part of the band The Savage Radley. Her debut album, Old Time Feeling, was co-produced by Jim James of My Morning Jacket. The album has been described as Americana, folk, country, and rock. She is signed to Verve Forecast Records. In 2021, she, as a solo artist, was inter alia part of the Newport Folk Festival in July.

In June 2022, Goodman released her second album, Teeth Marks, on Verve Forecast. She usually plays with her guitar tuned down a whole step, though some songs on the record were played in this tuning with a capo. The fifth track on the album, "If You Were Someone I Loved" deals with the opioid crisis. Because her debut album was released during the COVID-19 pandemic, Goodman did not headline a tour for the album. As such, her tour for Teeth Marks was her first solo tour.

Personal life 
Goodman is gay. She lives in Murray, Kentucky.

Discography
Studio albums
 Old Time Feeling (2020)
 Teeth Marks (2022)

References

External links
 http://www.sggoodman.net/

American alternative rock musicians
American women singer-songwriters
Singer-songwriters from Kentucky
21st-century American women singers
People from Fulton County, Kentucky
Verve Forecast Records artists
Year of birth missing (living people)
Living people
21st-century American singers
American lesbian musicians
Murray State University alumni
21st-century American women guitarists
Americana musicians
Guitarists from Kentucky
American country guitarists
American rock guitarists
American folk guitarists